The Carpentarian rock rat (Zyzomys palatalis) is a species of rodent in the family Muridae.
It is found only in Australia.

Taxonomy 
The description of the species was published by Darrell Kitchener in 1989, emerging from a revision of the genus Zyzomys.
The holotype was a pregnant female, collected at Wollogorang Station, in a deep ravine called Echo Gorge. 
The sandstone environment of the type location was an association of plants that included Eucalyptus dichromophloia.
The specific epithet palatis is derived from Latin, and refers to the characteristic morphology of their palate.

Description
It is a small and compact conilurine rodent.  Its fur is grey-brown above and pale below.  The tail is used to store fat at its base, making it carrot-shaped; the skin of the tail is fragile and easily damaged by handling. The average weight of individuals is about 120 g.

Distribution and habitat
It has a very limited range, being currently known from only five localities within the Wollogorang Station pastoral lease of the Northern Territory, close to the border with Queensland, near the Gulf of Carpentaria.  Crucial habitat characteristics are rugged sandstone gorges with a cover of dry monsoon vine-thicket or tropical woodland, and with access to permanent water.

Conservation
The estimated size of the wild population of this species is less than 2000.  The main threat is from hot, late dry-season, fires.  It is classified as being Critically Endangered.  It is subject to conservation management, including a captive breeding program at the Territory Wildlife Park.

References

Zyzomys
Mammals described in 1989
Taxa named by Darrell Kitchener
Taxonomy articles created by Polbot
Rodents of Australia